Dibolia is a genus of flea beetles in the family Chrysomelidae. There are some 60 described species worldwide.

Selected species

 Dibolia alpestris Mohr, 1981 g
 Dibolia borealis Chevrolat in Guérin-Méneville, 1834 i c g b (northern plantain flea beetle)
 Dibolia californica Parry, 1974 i c g
 Dibolia carpathica Weise, 1893 g
 Dibolia catherinia Mignot, 1971 i c g
 Dibolia championi Jacoby, 1885 i c g
 Dibolia chelones Parry, 1974 i c g b
 Dibolia chevrolati Allard, 1861 g
 Dibolia cryptocephala (Koch, 1803) g
 Dibolia cynoglossi (Koch, 1803) g
 Dibolia depressiuscula Letzner, 1846 g
 Dibolia dogueti Mohr, 1981 g
 Dibolia femoralis L.Redtenbacher, 1849 g
 Dibolia foersteri Bach, 1859 g
 Dibolia kansana Parry, 1974 i c g
 Dibolia libonoti Horn, 1889 i c g
 Dibolia magnifica Har.Lindberg, 1950 g
 Dibolia maura Allard, 1860 g
 Dibolia melampyri Parry, 1974 g
 Dibolia melanpyri Parry, 1974 i c g
 Dibolia obscura Parry, 1974 i c g
 Dibolia obtusa Wollaston, 1864 g
 Dibolia occultans (Koch, 1803) g
 Dibolia ovata J. L. LeConte, 1859 i c g
 Dibolia pelleti Allard, 1860 g
 Dibolia penstemonis Parry, 1974 i c g
 Dibolia peyerimhoffi Doguet g
 Dibolia phoenicia Allard, 1866 g
 Dibolia reyheria Mignot, 1971 i c g
 Dibolia rufofemorata Reitter, 1896 g
 Dibolia rugulosa L.Redtenbacher, 1849 g
 Dibolia russica Weise, 1893 g
 Dibolia schillingii (Letzner, 1847) g
 Dibolia sinuata Horn, 1889 i c g
 Dibolia timida (Illiger, 1794) g
 Dibolia tyrrhenica Mohr, 1981 g
 Dibolia veyreti Doguet, 1975 g

Data sources: i = ITIS, c = Catalogue of Life, g = GBIF, b = Bugguide.net

References

Further reading

External links

 

Alticini
Chrysomelidae genera
Articles created by Qbugbot
Taxa named by Pierre André Latreille